Giulio de' Medici may refer to:

Pope Clement VII, Giulio di Giuliano de' Medici, (1478–1534)
Giulio di Alessandro de' Medici ( 1533–1600), illegitimate son of the last ruler of Florence from the "senior" branch of the Medici, Alessandro de' Medici